Ishkoshim Range, also Ishkashim Range, is a mountain range in Pamir Mountains in Tajikistan, in the extreme southwest corner of the Gorno-Badakhshan Autonomous Province (Ishkoshim District). 

The range is about 90 km long, running along the right bank of the Panj River and the eastern border of Ishkoshim District with Roshtqal'a District. It contains the Ishkashim Important Bird Area.  The mountains rise in the south to a maximum altitude of 6,096 m at Mayakovsky Peak, located at the junction of Ishkoshim Range with the east–west Shakhdara Range. There is an abundance of hot springs in these mountains, including the Gharm-Chashma thermal spa.

References

External links
Gharm-Chashma Spring

Mountain ranges of Tajikistan
Gorno-Badakhshan Autonomous Region
Pamir Mountains